Plan-B Theatre   is the smallest fully professional theatre company in Salt Lake City, Utah.  Plan-B develops and produces unique and socially conscious theatre created by Utah playwrights, and is a resident company at the Rose Wagner Performing Arts Center. In fact, The Dramatists Guild of America has noted that Plan-B is the only professional theatre company in the United States producing full seasons of new work by local playwrights.

History
The company was founded in 1991 and incorporated in 1995 in Salt Lake City, Utah.

In response to COVID-19, Plan-B shifted its 30th anniversary season to a completely virtual one, producing an entire season of audio drama.

Plan-B has been honored with Organization of the Year awards from Equality Utah, Human Rights Campaign, and Transgender Education Advocates of Utah (twice). In 2015, the company was awarded both Utah's Governor's Leadership in the Arts Award and Salt Lake City's Mayor's Artist Award for Service to the Arts by an Organization. The International Centre for Women Playwrights honored the company with its 50/50 Applause Award in 2016, 2017 and 2018. The Parent Artist Advisory League selected the company for as one of the inaugural recipients of the PAAL Award in 2018. Plan-B was honored by Salt Lake City's Downtown Alliance in January of 2021 with the Downtown Achievement Award for 30 years of amplifying diverse voices and the company's response to COVID-19.

Plan-B has produced nearly 100 world premieres, including Utah’s first by an Asian American playwright, first by an African American playwright, first by a Latina playwright, and first by a Persian playwright. Nationally, five of these world premieres have been nominated for the American Theatre Critics Association/Steinberg Award for Best New American Play Produced Outside New York, five have enjoyed extended lives in New York, two have toured internationally, two have toured coast-to-coast and two have been nominated for the Pulitzer Prize for Drama.

Plan-B shares stories with a local point-of-view as well as global stories from a local perspective.

Plan-B nourishes a pool of local playwrights to rival that found in any other city in the country: we develop relationships with playwrights rather than plays.

Plan-B is the only professional theatre company in Utah creating both a new LGBTQIA+ play and a new play for K-6 students each season.

Each company decision reflects the company's commitment to representation.

Plan-B serves its community by reflecting it onstage.

Plan-B is committed to gender parity.

Plan-B is committed to LGBTQIA+ equality.

Plan-B is anti-racist and anti-racism.

Plan-B is anti-ableist and anti-ableism.

Plan-B welcomes the opportunity to learn from our own mistakes.

Plan-B welcomes the opportunity to speak less and listen more as our colleagues join the representation conversation.

Plan-B operates under an SPT-4 agreement with Actors' Equity Association, on the Tier Contract with the Stage Directors & Choreographers Society, and is an associate member of the National New Play Network.

 Plan-B Theatre
 QSaltLake: 25 Years of Plan-B
 City Weekly: A 25-Year Retrospective
 SLUG Magazine: Serious Entertainment: Plan-B Celebrates 20 Years of Socially Conscious Theatre

Culture of Salt Lake City
Organizations based in Salt Lake City
Performing groups established in 1991
Theatre companies in Utah
Tourist attractions in Salt Lake City
1991 establishments in Utah